Stephen F. Austin State University (SFA) is a public university in Nacogdoches, Texas. It was founded as a teachers' college in 1923 and subsequennly renamed after one of Texas's founding fathers, Stephen F. Austin. Its campus resides on part of the homestead of Thomas Jefferson Rusk. Stephen F. Austin is one of two independent public universities in Texas (i.e., those not affiliated with one of Texas's seven university systems). On November 29, 2022, the Board of Regents accepted an invitation to join the University of Texas System, pending approval from the Texas Legislature.

It is accredited by the Southern Association of Colleges and Schools to award bachelor's, master's, and doctoral degrees. Though the university is located in the rural East Texas college town of Nacogdoches, the vast majority of SFA students come from Greater Houston, the Dallas–Fort Worth metroplex, and other cities throughout Texas. SFA has also served students from 46 states outside Texas and 42 countries outside the United States.

The Stephen F. Austin Lumberjacks are members of the Western Athletic Conference and compete in Division I for all varsity sports. The Lumberjacks football team competes in the NCAA Division I Football Championship Subdivision. The Lumberjacks basketball team has made five appearances in the NCAA Division I Tournament, with two upset first-round wins in 2014 and 2016.

Academics

Stephen F. Austin offers more than 120 areas of study, including more than 80 undergraduate majors, nearly 60 graduate degrees, and four doctoral programs. Stephen F. Austin offers classes through six colleges and one independent school.

The Arthur Temple College of Forestry and Agriculture is nationally recognized, and houses one of only two schools of forestry in the State of Texas (and the only forestry college in the timber-producing East Texas region). It was responsible for mapping and recovery of debris and remains from Space Shuttle Columbia that fell on its premises in 2003.

During the 2021-2022 academic year, there were 2,792 degrees awarded. Of those degrees, 2,230 (79%) were undergraduate, 552 were post-graduate (20%), and 10 (1%) were doctoral.

Since 2007, Stephen F. Austin has served as the headquarters of the Association for Business Communication. It is also the home of the National Center for Pharmaceutical Crops, which in 2011 discovered a potential cancer-fighting agent from the extract of giant salvinia, one of the world's most notorious invasive species.

Colleges and schools
Nelson Rusche College of Business
Gerald W. Schlief School of Accountancy
James I. Perkins College of Education
Micky Elliott College of Fine Arts
School of Art
School of Music
School of Theatre
Arthur Temple College of Forestry and Agriculture
College of Liberal and Applied Arts
School of Social Work
College of Sciences and Mathematics
Richard and Lucille DeWitt School of Nursing
School of Honors
The Graduate School

Campus

In addition to the main campus which encompasses 430 acres, the university maintains a  agricultural research center for beef, poultry, and swine production and an equine center; an observatory for astronomy research, a 2,650-acre experimental forest in southwestern Nacogdoches County and a  forestry field station on the Sam Rayburn Reservoir. SFA has purple lights visible on top of the tallest buildings on campus, Steen Hall. A purple light also is illuminated in the Student Center clock tower.

Athletics

In tribute to the forestry industry, which is a major component of the area's economy, the men's athletic teams are called Lumberjacks, and women's teams are known as Ladyjacks. Lumberjacks name was chosen in 1923, when T. E. Ferguson, a professor of English at SFA, submitted name to the students and faculty assembly. The choice was made given the university's location in the Piney Woods, where forestry and timber products are a major part of the area's economy. All of SFA's athletic teams participate in the Western Athletic Conference which hosts teams from the states of Texas, Louisiana, and Arkansas. Stephen F. Austin's colors are Purple and White.

Men's NCAA Sports include baseball, basketball, cross country, football, golf, indoor & outdoor Track & Field. Women's NCAA Sports include basketball, bowling, cross country, golf, indoor & outdoor Track & Field, soccer, softball, tennis, volleyball.

Stephen F. Austin sports teams participate in NCAA Division I (Football Championship Subdivision for football) in the Western Athletic Conference, joining that league in July 2021 after spending the previous 34 years in the Southland Conference. SFA's football team earned a berth into the FCS playoffs in 2009, which was the first for the university since 1995. The team also earned a playoff berth in 2010, marking the first time in the program's history that the team had reached the playoffs in consecutive seasons. The 2010 season also marked the first time that the school had won an outright conference championship since 1989. Stephen F. Austin's only bowl appearance was the 1973 Poultry Bowl, in which the team defeated Gardner–Webb 31–10.

The men's basketball team reached its first NCAA tournament in 2009 after winning the Southland Conference regular season and tournament. They lost 59–44 to Syracuse. In their second appearance in 2014, they upset VCU in overtime, 77–75. In their third appearance in 2016, they upset 3rd seeded West Virginia 70–56. In the second round against 6th seeded Notre Dame they lost 77–76 on a buzzer beater by Notre Dame's Rex Pflueger. On November 26, 2019, in arguably the biggest upset in NCAA Division I basketball in 15 years, SFA upset #1-ranked Duke in overtime by a score of 85–83. This was the first home game against a nonconference opponent that Duke had lost in the Blue Devils' past 150 home games.

In 2020, the athletics department of Stephen F. Austin were found by the NCAA to have had several administrative errors in reporting the grades of the student athletes from 2013 to 2019, which resulted in the university having academically ineligible players to be on rosters. As a result, the SFA's football, men and women's basketball teams victories from this time span (including the 2016 men's basketball team win over WVU and the Southland Conference titles from 2014 to 2018) had to be vacated.

In July 2021, SFA joined the Western Athletic Conference.

Notable alumni and faculty

Points of interest and notable campus buildings
 Mast Arboretum
 The Stone Fort Museum, built in 1936, is a museum and a replica of the eighteenth century house built by Antonio Gil Y'Barbo, the earliest Spanish settler of Nacogdoches.
 The Planetarium
The Observatory
 SFA Art Galleries
 Griffith Gallery
 The Art Center
 Ralph W. Steen Library
 The AARC, Academic Assistance and Resource Center, is located on the first floor of the Ralph W. Steen Library, and offers free tutoring to Stephen F. Austin State University students:
 The ETRC, East Texas Research Center, is located for public use on the second floor of the Ralph W. Steen Library.
 The East Texas Historical Association is based on the Stephen F. Austin campus.

Gallery

Notes

References

External links

 
 Stephen F. Austin Athletics website

 
Universities and colleges accredited by the Southern Association of Colleges and Schools
Educational institutions established in 1923
Education in Nacogdoches County, Texas
Buildings and structures in Nacogdoches County, Texas
Tourist attractions in Nacogdoches County, Texas
Public universities and colleges in Texas
1923 establishments in Texas